Revell House,  also known as the Hutchinson-Revell House, in Burlington, New Jersey, is the oldest building in Burlington County and one of the oldest residences in New Jersey. It was constructed in 1685 by George Hutchinson, a wealthy Quaker distiller, and sold to Thomas Revell who used it as offices from 1696 to 1699. Originally located at 8 East Pearl Street, the building was relocated to 213 Wood Street in 1966.

According to tradition, Benjamin Franklin was sold gingerbread and given supper by a friendly Burlington woman on his way to Philadelphia. This led for the house to sometimes be referred as the Gingerbread House. It is a contributing property of the Burlington Historic District bounded by the Delaware River and High, West Broad, Talbot, and Reed Streets listed March 3, 1975.

See also 

 List of the oldest buildings in New Jersey
 National Register of Historic Places listings in Burlington County, New Jersey

References

External links 
Flickr photo

Burlington, New Jersey
Buildings and structures in Burlington County, New Jersey
National Register of Historic Places in Burlington County, New Jersey
Houses on the National Register of Historic Places in New Jersey
Historic district contributing properties in New Jersey